LiveonRelease was a Canadian all-girl pop punk band from Vancouver formed 2000 and broke up in 2003.The name,  
LiveonRelease originates from basketball jargon.

In 2002, they released Seeing Red, which included the singles "I'm Afraid of Britney Spears", "Get With It", and "Emotional Griptape". "I'm Afraid of Britney Spears" also appeared on the Dude, Where's My Car? soundtrack.

In 2003, they released their second album Goes on a Fieldtrip, which included the single "Let's Go". Their second CD is produced by Peter Karroll & Doug Fury Inc, with the executive producer being Bif Naked. This CD was mixed by Shaun Thingvold.

LiveonRelease disbanded shortly after the release of Goes on a Fieldtrip.

Members
 Colette Trudeau: vocals
 Brittin Karroll: lead guitar
 Foxx Herst: bass guitar
 Leah Emmott: drums

Discography

Studio albums 
 Seeing Red (2002, includes singles, "I'm Afraid of Britney Spears", "Emotional Griptape" and "Get With It")
 Goes on a Field Trip (2003, includes singles, Let's Go)

EP 
 Fifteen Will Get You Twenty (2002, includes re-recorded and re-mastered songs from off of Seeing Red)

Movie soundtrack 
 "I'm Afraid of Britney Spears" appears on the Dude, Where's My Car? soundtrack.

Music videos

See also
List of bands from British Columbia
List of bands from Canada

External links
Liveonrelease at Yahoo
Interview at TYCP Magazine

Musical groups established in 2000
Musical groups disestablished in 2003
Musical groups from Vancouver
Canadian pop punk groups
Canadian girl groups
2000 establishments in British Columbia
2003 disestablishments in British Columbia
Cultural depictions of Britney Spears